The African marsh rat or common dasymys (Dasymys incomtus) is a species of rodent in the family Muridae.
It is found in Angola, Democratic Republic of the Congo, Ethiopia, Kenya, Malawi, South Africa, South Sudan, Tanzania, Uganda, Zambia, and Zimbabwe.
Its natural habitats are moist savanna, temperate grassland, subtropical or tropical seasonally wet or flooded lowland grassland, and swamps.

References

 

Dasymys
Rodents of Africa
Mammals described in 1847
Taxonomy articles created by Polbot